Tripurasundari may refer to:

Queen Tripurasundari of Nepal, regent and writer-translator
Tripura Sundari, a Hindu goddess
Tripurasundari, Baitadi, a village in Mahakali zone, Nepal
Tripurasundari, Dolpa, a municipality in Karnali province, Nepal
Tripurasundari, Dhading, a rural municipality in Dhading district, Nepal
Tripurasundari, Sindhupalchok, a rural municipality in Sindhupalchok, Nepal